Redouane Cherifi (born 22 February 1993) is an Algerian footballer who plays for NC Magra as a defender.

Career
Cherifi started his career playing for JSM Chéraga, then he joined CA Batna, USM Bel-Abbès and USM Alger. In October 2020, he transferred to Egyptian club Ismaily.

Honours

Club
 USM Alger
 Algerian Ligue Professionnelle 1 (1): 2018–19

References

External links

NFT Profile

1993 births
Living people
Association football defenders
Algerian footballers
Algeria international footballers
Algeria under-23 international footballers
USM Bel Abbès players
USM Alger players
CA Batna players
JSM Chéraga players
Algerian Ligue Professionnelle 1 players
Algerian Ligue 2 players
Algerian expatriate footballers
Egyptian Premier League players
Ismaily SC players
Algerian expatriate sportspeople in Egypt
Expatriate footballers in Egypt
21st-century Algerian people